Hisarköy (also: Hisar) is a village in the Ağlasun District of Burdur Province in Turkey. Its population is 170 (2021).

References

Villages in Ağlasun District